The R735 road is a regional road in County Wexford, Ireland. It connects the R734 road to the N30 road, via the villages of Newbawn and Adamstown.

References

Regional roads in the Republic of Ireland
Roads in County Wexford